Vice Admiral Jan-Willem Kelder (31 May 19497 March 2021) was a Royal Netherlands Navy officer who is a former Commander of the Royal Netherlands Navy and Admiral Benelux.

High command 
From 2002 to 2005 Kelder served as deputy Commander of the naval forces. He was promoted to Commander of the Royal Netherlands Navy on 5 September 2005. He was succeeded by Lieutenant General Rob Zuiderwijk on 31 August 2007.

Personal life 
Kelder was married and had two childeren and four grandchildren. He died on 7 March 2021 after a short illness.

References

External links 
 

1949 births
2021 deaths
Commanders of the Royal Netherlands Navy
Royal Netherlands Marine Corps generals
Royal Netherlands Navy personnel